Ronald William Reynolds (29 April 1916 – 26 October 1992) was an Australian rules footballer who played with South Melbourne in the Victorian Football League (VFL) and Port Melbourne in the Victorian Football Association.

Family
The son of William Reynolds, and Elizabeth Mary Reynolds, née Hickey, Ronald Reynolds was born in South Melbourne, Victoria on 29 April 1916.

War service
Reynolds served in the Australian Army during World War II.

Notes

External links 
 
 
 Ron Reynolds, at The VFA Project.

1916 births
1992 deaths
Australian rules footballers from Victoria (Australia)
Sydney Swans players
Port Melbourne Football Club players
Australian Army personnel of World War II
Australian Army soldiers